Salzbrücke is a former Verwaltungsgemeinschaft ("collective municipality") in the district Schmalkalden-Meiningen, in Thuringia, Germany. The seat of the Verwaltungsgemeinschaft was in Obermaßfeld-Grimmenthal. It was disbanded on 1 January 2012.

The Verwaltungsgemeinschaft Salzbrücke consisted of the following municipalities:
Bauerbach 
Belrieth
Einhausen 
Ellingshausen
Leutersdorf 
Neubrunn
Obermaßfeld-Grimmenthal
Ritschenhausen 
Vachdorf 
Wölfershausen

Former Verwaltungsgemeinschaften in Thuringia